Valeria Ferrari is an Italian physicist whose research concerns the theoretical modeling of gravitational waves, and the oscillations in black holes and neutron stars that could cause them. She is a professor of theoretical physics at Sapienza University of Rome.

Education and career
Ferrari was born on 21 March 1952 in Monterotondo, a municipality within the Metropolital City of Rome. She studied physics at Sapienza University of Rome under the supervision of Giovanni Vittorio Pallottino, earning a degree in 1976 with the thesis On dispersion phenomena in a gravitational wave antenna.

After working as a researcher at Sapienza University from 1977 to 1993, she became an associate professor in 1993, and full professor in 2000. Her doctoral students at Sapienza University have included M. Alessandra Papa in 1997 and Raffaella Schneider in 2000.

Selected publications

Research articles

Book

References

External links
Home page

Year of birth missing (living people)
Living people
Italian physicists
Italian women physicists
Sapienza University of Rome alumni
Academic staff of the Sapienza University of Rome